Downtown Science is the only studio album by American rap duo Downtown Science. It was released in 1991 through Def Jam Recordings/Columbia Records/Sony Music Entertainment. Recording sessions took place in New York City at Chung King Studios, Apollo Studios, Sigma Sound Studios and Nightmare Productions, Inc. Production was handled by members Bosco Money and Sam Sever, who also served as executive producers.

The album was a critical success, earning many positive reviews, however it was not successful commercially, thus the album and its two singles, "Room to Breathe" and "Radioactive", did not make it to the Billboard charts.

Track listing

Personnel
Kenneth Carabello – main artist, vocals, producer, executive producer
Sam Citrin – main artist, producer, executive producer
Kevin Reynolds – recording & mixing
Adam Gazzola – recording & mixing
Warren Shaw – recording
Michael Baksh – photography

References

External links

1991 debut albums
Def Jam Recordings albums
Albums recorded at Chung King Studios